Inter-Provincial Limited Over Tournament was a domestic Limited overs cricket competition in Sri Lanka held by Sri Lanka Cricket. It is a part of their Inter-Provincial Cricket Tournament program. From 2008 the Inter-Provincial Limited Over Tournament became the mainstream domestic List A competition in Sri Lanka, with the Premier Limited Overs Tournament being the other, which is played between the clubs in Sri Lanka. Kandurata elevens has won all three tournaments with the first one being shared with Wayamba elevens.

History

Inaugural season

Kandurata elevens and Wayamba elevens met in the Final, however the match ended up in a No Result.

Second season

Kandurata elevens wins their second Inter-Provincial Limited Over Tournament.

Third season

2011 hosted the third season of the Inter-Provincial Limited Over Tournament. It was a shorter tournament compared to the previous one with only 13 matches, and most of them being held at the Sinhalese Sports Club Ground with all three finals at the upgraded R. Premadasa Stadium in Colombo. This edition also featured the Uva cricket team's debut in the limited overs tournament of the Inter-Provincial Cricket Tournament, having previously featured in the Inter-Provincial First Class Tournament. This season also saw the introduction of the Basnahira cricket team with the merger of Basnahira North and Basnahira South cricket teams. It was the first time five different teams represented five different provinces in the tournament.

Teams

Winners

Competition placings

Statistics and records

See also
 Premier Limited Overs Tournament

References

Notes

2008 establishments in Sri Lanka
Professional sports leagues in Sri Lanka
Recurring sporting events established in 2008
Sri Lankan domestic cricket competitions
List A cricket competitions